The Federal Tax Ombudsman (FTO) evaluates complaints against federal tax agencies. Article 37 of the Constitution of Pakistan calls for inexpensive and expeditious justice. The Federal Tax Ombudsman Ordinance of 2000 and the Federal Ombudsman Institutional Reforms (FOIR) Act of 2013 confer powers, including administrative and financial autonomy. This aligns with the separation of Pakistan's judiciary and executive branches in accordance with the Constitution.

History 
The Federal Tax Ombudsman (FTO) office was established in 2000. It was mandated to respond to, find, and rectify maladministration by revenue agencies.

Institution of Ombudsman in Pakistan 
In Pakistan, the establishment of an Ombudsman institution was advocated in Article 276 of the Interim Constitution of 1972, which provided for the appointment of a Federal Ombudsman and Provincial Ombudsmen. The Constitution of 1973 provided for the establishment of Federal Ombudsman, and the institution was eventually created through the Establishment of the Office of Wafaqi Mohtasib (Ombudsman) Order of 1983, which was the President’s first order of 1983.

On 8 August 1983, the Ombudsman began functioning. Other Ombudsman institutions in Pakistan include Provincial Ombudsman offices in Khyber Pakhtunkhwa, Punjab, Baluchistan, Sindh, and Azad Jammu and Kashmir; Federal Banking Ombudsman; Federal Insurance Ombudsman; Federal Tax Ombudsman; Federal Ombudsman for Protection of Women against Harassment at Workplace; and Provincial Ombudsman for Protection of Women against Harassment at Workplace in Punjab and Sindh. All Ombudsmen institutions informally collaborate through the Forum of Pakistan Ombudsmen (FPO). They are also affiliated with the Asian Ombudsman Association (AOA), the International Ombudsman Institute (IOI), and the OIC Ombudsman Association.

Mandate and empowerment of FTO 
In the Federal Tax Ombudsman Ordinance of 2000, the FTO was mandated to "diagnose, investigate, redress and rectify any injustice done to a person through maladministration by functionaries administering tax laws". 

According to Section 11 of the Federal Ombudsmen Institutional Reforms Act of 2013, the FTO may stay the operation of an impugned order or decision for a period up to sixty days. The FTO is responsible for findings, recommendations, and contempt proceedings (equal to the Supreme Court); according to the Powers of a Civil Court under Code of Civil Procedure of 1908, this includes summoning any person and examining him on oath, enforcing the attendance of any person, compelling production of documents, receiving evidence on affidavits, and issuing commission for examination of witnesses.

Legal framework 
The FTO's legal framework consists of the following acts and reforms: the Establishment of the Office of Federal Tax Ombudsman Ordinance of 2000, the Federal Ombudsmen Institutional Reforms Act of 2013, and the Federal Tax Ombudsman Investigation and Disposal of Complaints Regulations of 2001.

Scope of FTO 
The FTO manages complaints by aggrieved existing or prospective taxpayers, references by the Hon’ble President of Pakistan, references by the Supreme Court of Pakistan or High Courts, and Own Motion Notices.

Role of FTO 
The FTO's roles include an accountability mechanism for maladministration, a support mechanism for Federal Board of Revenue (FBR) and revenue division, and the promotion of good governance.

Jurisdiction of FTO 
FTO entertains complaints against the functionaries of FBR administering laws relating to: income tax, sales tax, customs duties, and federal excise duties.

Access 
As defined in Section 2(3) of the FTO Ordinance of 2000, any person can file a complaint with the FTO if he or she feels aggrieved by any action or inaction of any functionary of the Revenue Division or FBR or its field formations which involve injustice and maladministration.

Complaints that cannot be lodged include those that are subjudice before a court or tribunal or authority on the date of receipt of the complaint; relate to assessment of income, determination of liability of tax or duty, classification or valuation of goods, interpretation of law in respect of which legal remedies of appeal are available (unless clearly intermingled with maladministration); are submitted by tax employees concerning service matters; are anonymous or pseudonymous complaints; or are time-barred complaints older than six months. (However, a time-barred complaint can be condoned by the Hon’ble FTO, if he deems it proper in the interest of justice.)

A complaint may be filed online, by email, by post, through a courier service, or in-person. A complaint may be filed on FTO's "Form A", which are available on FTO's website. An affidavit is required with the complaint and are available for free at FTO offices.

Merits of FTO's relief-providing mechanism 

 Free of Cost. 
 Fast (On the average complaints are decided in less than 2 months). 
 Citizens friendly. 
 Congenial and reformatory rather than adversarial. 
 Simple, easily understandable and devoid of legal jargon. 
 Aggrieved parties are not required to hire counsels for pleading their cases before the Tax Ombudsman. 
 There is a stipulated timeframe for disposal of cases filed with FTO Offices. Hence, complainants are not subjected to suffer indefinitely as is the case of formal judicial system. 
 The FBR or its lower offices against whom the order is passed by the FTO has only one appeal to the President of Pakistan, as against the opportunity of filing multiple appeals in the higher courts in formal judicial system. 
 The Complainants do not fall prey to adjournments of hearings as the cases are decided promptly in a few hearings.

Timeliness 

According to Section 10(3) of the Ordinance, a complaint is to be made no later than six months from the day on which the person aggrieved first had the notice of the matter. According to Section 9(1) of FOIRA of 2013, the agency is to submit written comments within 15 days, which is further extendable for seven days on a sufficient cause. 

According to Section 11(1) of the Ordinance and Section 9(5) of FOIRA of 2013, The FTO is to make a decision within a period of 60 days of the receipt of the complaint. The Revenue Division is to inform the action taken within the specified time. The FTO has power to review, within 30 days, the findings or orders on a review petition made by an aggrieved party. According to Section 13(2) of FOIRA of 2013, the FTO shall decide the review petition within 45 days. According to Section 14(1) of FOIRA of 2013, representation may be filed to the President within thirty days of the decision of the FTO. According to Section 14(2) of FOIRA of 2013, the operation of the impugned order shall remain suspended for 60 days in case of filing of representation before the President of Pakistan. According to Section 14(5) of FOIRA of 2013, the Representation shall be decided within 90 days.

Special investigations 
The FTO's special investigations include the Smuggled Vehicles Amnesty Scheme, the ISAF Container Scam, and the One Man Inquiry Commission Third Interim Report.

Regional FTO Offices 
The FTO has regional offices in Lahore, Karachi, Quetta, Peshawar, Faisalabad, Multan, and Gujranwala.

References

Ombudsman organizations
Pakistan
Pakistan federal departments and agencies